The 2009 Yokohama V8 Ute Racing Series was a motor racing series for Ford Falcon and Holden Utility Trucks built and conforming to V8 Utes series regulations and those holding valid licence to compete as issued by series organisers Spherix and Australian V8 Ute Racing Pty. Ltd. The series formed the ninth running of a national series for V8 Utes in Australia. The series began on 19 March 2009 at the Adelaide Street Circuit and ended on 6 December at the Homebush Street Circuit after 24 races, although one was declared a 'no-race'.

Former Rugby League footballer Jack Elsegood, driving a Ford Falcon XR8 Ute prepared by Wilson Brothers Racing, won his first national series.

Teams and drivers
The following drivers competed in the 2009 Australian V8 Ute Racing Series. The series comprised fifteen races, at five race meetings, held in three states.

Results and standings

Race calendar
The 2009 V8 Utes Series consisted of eight rounds, all of which were held on the support programme of the V8 Supercar Championship Series.

Drivers' points 
The V8 Utes series is rare, in that qualifying carries as many points as each of the three races that occur for each round.

References

External links
 Official series website
 2009 Racing Results Archive

V8 Utes
V8 Ute Racing Series